In geometry, the great triambic icosahedron and medial triambic icosahedron (or midly triambic icosahedron) are visually identical dual uniform polyhedra. The exterior surface also represents the De2f2 stellation of the icosahedron. These figures can be differentiated by marking which intersections between edges are true vertices and which are not. In the above images, true vertices are marked by gold spheres, which can be seen in the concave Y-shaped areas. Alternatively, if the faces are filled with the even–odd rule, the internal structure of both shapes will differ.

The 12 vertices of the convex hull matches the vertex arrangement of an icosahedron.

Great triambic icosahedron 
The great triambic icosahedron is the dual of the great ditrigonal icosidodecahedron, U47. It has 20 inverted-hexagonal (triambus) faces, shaped like a three-bladed propeller. It has 32 vertices: 12 exterior points, and 20 hidden inside. It has 60 edges.

The dihedral angle equals .

Medial triambic icosahedron 

The medial triambic icosahedron is the dual of the ditrigonal dodecadodecahedron, U41. It has 20 faces, each being simple concave isogonal hexagons or triambi. It has 24 vertices: 12 exterior points, and 12 hidden inside. It has 60 edges.

The dihedral angle equals .

Unlike the great triambic icosahedron, the medial triambic icosahedron is topologically a regular polyhedron of index two. By distorting the triambi into regular hexagons, one obtains a quotient space of the hyperbolic order-5 hexagonal tiling:

As a stellation 

It is Wenninger's 34th model as his 9th stellation of the icosahedron

See also 
 Triakis icosahedron
 Small triambic icosahedron
 Medial rhombic triacontahedron

References

 

 H.S.M. Coxeter, Regular Polytopes, (3rd edition, 1973), Dover edition, 3.6 6.2 Stellating the Platonic solids, pp.96-104

External links 

 gratrix.net Uniform polyhedra and duals
 bulatov.org  Medial triambic icosahedron Great triambic icosahedron

Polyhedra
Polyhedral stellation
Dual uniform polyhedra